Nyhavn 47 is an 18th-century property situated at the corner of Nyhavn (No. 47) and Toldbodgade (No. 2) in central Copenhagen, Denmark. It owes its current appearance to a renovation undertaken by Julius Andreas Blom in 184245. It  was listed in the Danish registry of protected buildings and places in 1932. Notable former residents include the merchant and shipowner Peter Christian Knudtzon.

History

18th century

The site was in the late 17th century part of a much larger property. The large property was listed as No. 28 in St. Ann's East Quarter in Copenhagen's first cadastre of 1689 and was at that time owned by tanner Villum Lydersen. It was later divided into four smaller properties (now Nyhavn 41–47). The present building on the site was probably constructed in 1737-38 for skipper Ole Pedersen. The property was listed as No. 24 in the new cadastre of 1756 and was then owned by sailmaker Ole Pedersen.

The property was later acquired by sailmaker Hans Peter Sandgaard. His property was home to three households at the 1787 census. His own household comprised his wife Ellen Maria, his sister Maria Margrethe Scheekel, six apprentices (aged 16 to 25) and one maid. Christian Samuel Heisse, an office clerk (skriverkarl) working for Erich Erichsen, resided in another apartment with his wife Karen Maria Holms Datter, their one-year-old son Carl Johan Heisse, his mother-in-law Sara Marttha Holm and one maid. Carsten Hansen, a beer seller (øltapper), resided in the third apartment with his wife Maren Odels Datter and three lodgers (all of whom were sailors).

19th century
The number of residents had increased to 22 at the time of the 1801 census. Sandgaard resided in the building with his wife, three apprentices and one maid. Frodens Christian Jørgensen, a broker (mægler), resided in another apartment with his wife Borette Elisabeth Buntzen, their three children (aged one to five) and two maids. Poul Poulsen, a beer seller (øltapper), resided in the building with his wife Anne Margrethe Bledel, their 17-year-old daughter Mette Margrethe Poulsen, one maid and five lodgers.

The property was again listed as No. 24 in the new cadastre of 1806. It was at that time still owned by Sandgaard.

 
The property was later acquired by master sailmaker Rasmus Andreas Holm (1799-1863), son of sailmaker Peter Holm (1764-1812). His father had been the owner of the adjacent property at No. 23 (now Nyhavn 45). On 10 January 1920, Rasmus Andreas Holm had married Christiane Mammen (1805-1877), a foster daughter of his uncle Jacob Holm.

At the time of the next census, in 1834,
Holm's property was home to 25 residents in five households. Rasmus and Christiane Holm resided on the ground floor with their two children (aged two and five), three apprentices and two maids. Carl Friderichsen, a helmsman, resided on the first floor with his wife Præbene Jantzen, their two children (aged one and four) and one maid. Madsine Sophie Holm, Rasmus Holm's mother, resided on the second floor with her son Hendrich Peter Holm, Rasmus Bang, a sailmaker employed by Holm, was also resident on the second floor with his wife Christiane Christensen and their three children (aged three to seven). Peter Nicolajsen Skjerbeck, a carpenter and the proprietor of a tavern in the basement, resided in the associated dwelling with his wife Juliana Marie Kock, their 12-year-old son and one maid.

At the time of the 1840 census, Holm's property was home to 24 residents in four households. Holm's household comprised his wife, their now four children (aged two to 11), four apprentices and two maids. Peter Gottschalck (1799-1863), a clerk (hofskriver) at Prince Ferdinand's court. resided on the first floor with his wife Nicoline Zimmer (1798-1877) and one maid. Madsine Holm was still residing on the second floor. She now lived there with her cousin Birgitte Haagensen. Johan Caspersen. a sailor, resided in the basement with his wife Sophie Jensen, their two-year-old son, a six-year-old boy  in their care, one maid and two lodgers.

In 184245, Julius Andreas Blom (1815-1900)was responsible for a comprehensive renovation of the building. Blom was the son of master mason Thomas Blom.

The building was home to 18 residents in three households at the time of the 1845census. Anders Hansen Brandt (1803-1860), a grocer (urtekræmmer) and principal (forstander), resided in the building with his wife Bertha Margrethe Brandt (née Hansen, 1808–1868), their five children (aged one to 19), three male servants and one maid. Thønnes Petersen Dahl, a ship captain, resided in the building with his wife Johanne Caroline Dahl, their 11-year-old foster daughter and one maid. Madsine Holm was still resident on the second floor with her son Peter Holm and one maid.

Np. 24 was only home to two households in 1850. Peter Christian Knudtzon, a merchant and shipowner, resided in the ground floor with his wife Lucinda Gotschnak, their five children (aged one to nine), one male servant and four maids. Carl Frederik Uthicke (1799-1863), another merchant (grosserer), resided in the building with his wife Marie Uthicke	(née Lund) and one maid.

In 1859, Knutzon purchased the property at Amaliegade 14- The property at the corner of Nyhavn and Toldbodgade was later owned by furier H.F. Brinckmann. In 1985, he filled out the gap between Nyhavn 47 and Nyhavn 45 with a recessed side wing.

Marine Kirstine Rasmussen, a widow, resided in the building with one maid and the 68-year-old unmarried woman Ulrikke Flor. The widows Ellen Barbara Abigal Hall, Auguste Elisabeth Husselbulch	and Catarine Marie Jørgensen	 were alsæ residents of the building. Niels Anton Schouv, a teacher, resided in the building with his wife Emilie Birgitte Schouv, his mother 	Marie Kirstine Schouv, 62-year-old Frederikke Gerner and two maids. Anders Nielsen, proprietor of the tavern in the basement, resided in the associated dwelling with his wife Marie Nielsen, their three-year-old son and two maids.

20th century
 

A grocery shop was for many years based on the ground floor of the building. The White Star Line's ticket agency was located on the first floor in the 1910s.

Architecture

Nyhavn 47 is constructed with three storeys over a walk-out basement. It has a four-bays-long facade on Nyhavn, a just two-bays-long facade on Toldbodgade and a chamfered corner bay. The plastered facade is finished with shadow joints, a wide frieze below the first floor windows, triangular pediments above the first floor windows and a modillioned cornice. The chamfered corner features a balcony on the first floor and a small balcony supported by heavy corbels on the first floor and a built-in flower box supported by corbels on the second floor. Nyhavn 47 is via a recessed two-bay connector from 1845 attached to Nyhavn 45.

Today
The building was owned by Niels-Jørgen Frandsen in 2008. Nyhavnskroen, a restaurant serving a traditional Danish cuisine, is based on the ground floor. McJoy's, a British-style gastro pub, is based in the basement.

References

External links

 Holm
 Source
 Brandt
 Source

Listed residential buildings in Copenhagen